The 1960 Australian GT Championship was a CAMS sanctioned Australian motor racing title for drivers of cars complying with Appendix K Gran Turismo regulations. The title, which was the inaugural Australian GT Championship, was contested over a single 50-mile race held at the Mount Panorama Circuit, Bathurst, New South Wales on 2 October 1960.

The championship was won by Leo Geoghegan driving a Lotus Elite.

Results

References

Further reading
 The Sydney Morning Herald, Monday, 3 October 1960, pages 1, 5 & 8

Australian GT Championship
GT Championship
Motorsport in Bathurst, New South Wales